Events from the year 1530 in France

Incumbents
 Monarch – Francis I

Events
Collège de France established

Births

Full date missing
Jean Bodin, philosopher and politician (died 1596).
Jean Nicot, diplomat and scholar (died 1600)
Charlotte de Laval, noblewoman (died 1568)
Edmond Auger, Jesuit (died 1591)

Deaths

Full date missing
François de Dinteville, Catholic bishop (born 1498)
Estienne de La Roche, mathematician (born 1470)

See also

References

1530s in France